

Championships

1996 Olympics
Men: United States of America 96, Yugoslavia 69
Women:  United States of America 111, Australia 87

Professional
Men
1996 NBA Finals:  Chicago Bulls over the Seattle SuperSonics 4-2.  MVP:  Michael Jordan
1996 NBA Playoffs
1995-96 NBA season
1996 NBA draft
1996 NBA All-Star Game
Eurobasket:  None.
Women
Eurobasket Women: None

College
Men
NCAA
Division I:  Kentucky 76, Syracuse 67
NIT:  University of Nebraska def. St. Joseph's University
Division II: Fort Hays State University 70, Northern Kentucky University 63
Division III: Rowan University 100, Hope College 93
NAIA
Division I Oklahoma City University 86, Georgetown (Ky.) 80
Division II Albertson (Idaho) 81, Whitworth (Wash.) 72 OT
NJCAA
Division I Sullivan College, Louisville, KY 103, Allegany CC, Cumberland, MD 98 O/T
Division II Penn Valley CC, Mo. 93, Kishwukee CC, Ill. 88
Division III Sullivan County CC 74, Gloucester County College 63
Women
NCAA
Division I:  University of Tennessee 83, University of Georgia 65
Division II: North Dakota State 104, Shippensburg 78
Division III: Wis.-Oshkosh 66  Mount Union 50
NAIA
Division I: Southern Nazarene (Okla.) 80, Southeastern Oklahoma State University 79
Division II Western Oregon 80, Huron (S.D.) 77
NJCAA
Division I Trinity Valley CC 69, Independence CC 55
Division II Lansing CC 74, Kankakee CC 68
Division III Central Lakes College-Brainerd 71, Monroe CC 57

Awards and honors

Professional
Men
NBA Most Valuable Player Award:   Michael Jordan
NBA Rookie of the Year Award:  Damon Stoudamire, Toronto Raptors
NBA Defensive Player of the Year Award:  Gary Payton, Seattle SuperSonics
NBA Coach of the Year Award: Phil Jackson, Chicago Bulls

Collegiate 
 Men
John R. Wooden Award: Marcus Camby, Massachusetts
Naismith College Coach of the Year: John Calipari, Massachusetts
Frances Pomeroy Naismith Award: Eddie Benton, Vermont
Associated Press College Basketball Player of the Year: Marcus Camby, UMass
NCAA basketball tournament Most Outstanding Player: Miles Simon, Arizona
Associated Press College Basketball Coach of the Year: Gene Keady, Purdue
Naismith Outstanding Contribution to Basketball: Boris Stankovic
 Women
Naismith College Player of the Year: Saudia Roundtree, Georgia
Naismith College Coach of the Year: Andy Landers, Georgia
Wade Trophy: Jennifer Rizzotti, Connecticut
Frances Pomeroy Naismith Award: Jennifer Rizzotti, Connecticut
Associated Press Women's College Basketball Player of the Year: Jennifer Rizzotti, Connecticut
NCAA basketball tournament Most Outstanding Player: Michelle M. Marciniak, Tennessee
Basketball Academic All-America Team: Jennifer Rizzotti, UConn
Basketball Academic All-America Team: Katie Smith, Ohio State
Basketball Academic All-America Team: Tricia Wakely, Drake
Carol Eckman Award: Joann Rutherford, Missouri
Associated Press College Basketball Coach of the Year: Angie Lee, Iowa

Naismith Memorial Basketball Hall of Fame
Class of 1996:
Krešimir Ćosić
George Gervin
Gail Goodrich
Nancy Lieberman
David Thompson
George Yardley

Events
The WNBA formed.

Movies
Celtic Pride
Space Jam
Sunset Park (film)

Deaths
 January 13 — Dean Kelley, American national college champion at Kansas (1952), Olympic gold medalist (1952) (born 1931)
 May 18 — Chet Forte, All-American college player (Columbia) (born 1935)
 June 14 — Jack Ragland, American Olympic gold medalist (1936) (born 1913)
 July 16 — Harold E. Foster, Hall of Fame player and Wisconsin Badgers men's basketball head coach (born 1906)
 July 29 — Lauren "Laddie" Gale, Hall of Fame player for the Oregon Ducks men's basketball and early professional (born 1917)
 August 10 — Derek Smith, American NBA player (born 1961)
 September 25 — Red Mihalik, Hall of Fame NBA, NCAA and Olympic referee (born 1916)

See also
 Timeline of women's basketball

References